The Damköhler numbers (Da) are dimensionless numbers used in chemical engineering to relate the chemical reaction timescale (reaction rate) to the transport phenomena rate occurring in a system. It is named after German chemist Gerhard Damköhler. 
The Karlovitz number (Ka) is related to the Damköhler number by Da = 1/Ka.

In its most commonly used form, the Damköhler number relates the reaction timescale to the convection time scale, volumetric flow rate, through the reactor for continuous (plug flow or stirred tank) or semibatch chemical processes:
 

In reacting systems that include interphase mass transport, the second Damköhler number (DaII) is defined as the ratio of the chemical reaction rate to the mass transfer rate
 

It is also defined as the ratio of the characteristic fluidic and chemical time scales:
 

Since the reaction rate determines the reaction timescale, the exact formula for the Damköhler number varies according to the rate law equation. For a general chemical reaction A → B following the Power law kinetics of n-th order, the Damköhler number for a convective flow system is defined as:

 
where:
 k = kinetics reaction rate constant
 C0 = initial concentration
 n = reaction order
  = mean residence time or space time

On the other hand, the second Damköhler number is defined as:
 
where
 kg is the global mass transport coefficient
 a is the interfacial area

The value of Da provides a quick estimate of the degree of conversion that can be achieved. As a rule of thumb, when Da is less than 0.1 a conversion of less than 10% is achieved, and when Da is greater than 10 a conversion of more than 90% is expected. The limit  is called the Burke–Schumann limit.

Derivation for decomposition of a single species
From the general mole balance on some species , where for a CSTR steady state and perfect mixing are assumed,

 

 

 

Assuming a constant volumetric flow rate , which is the case for a liquid reactor or a gas phase reaction with no net generation of moles,

 

 

 

where the space time is defined to be the ratio of the reactor volume to volumetric flow rate. It is the time required for a slug of fluid to pass through the reactor. In addition, for a single reaction a  conversion may be defined in terms of the limiting reactant, for the simple decomposition that is species 

 

 

 

 

As can be seen, as the Damköhler number increases the other term must decrease. The ensuing polynomial can be solved and the conversion for the rule of thumb Damköhler numbers found. Alternatively, one can graph the expressions and see where they intersect with the line given by the inverse Damköhler number to see the solution for conversion. In the plot below, the y-axis is the inverse Damköhler number and the x-axis the conversion. The rule-of-thumb Damköhler numbers have been placed as dashed horizontal lines.

References

Catalysis
Chemical reaction engineering
Dimensionless numbers of chemistry
Dimensionless numbers of fluid mechanics
Fluid dynamics